Nary is an unincorporated community in Hubbard County, in the U.S. state of Minnesota.

History
A post office was established in Nary in 1899, closed in 1917, reopened in 1918, then closed permanently in 1924. The community was named for Thomas J. Nary, a businessperson in the lumber industry.

References

Former municipalities in Minnesota
Unincorporated communities in Hubbard County, Minnesota
Unincorporated communities in Minnesota